Uwe Conradt (born 31 March 1977) is a German Christian Democratic politician who has been serving as Mayor of Saarbrücken since 2019.

Politics 
Uwe Conradt joined the Young Union in 1990 and became a member of the CDU in 1994. He was Member of the Dudweiler District Council from 1999 until 2004 and became Member of the Saarbrücken City Council in 2009. He succeeded Peter Jacoby as Member of the Landtag of Saarland in August 2012 until 2016, when he was appointed Director of the State Media Authority.

He succeeded Peter Strobel as Speaker of the CDU City Council Group in 2018 and ran for the office of Mayor in the local elections on 26 May 2019. He received 29.0 percent, finishing second to the incumbent Charlotte Britz, a Social Democrat, who received 36.8 percent. Both advanced to the runoff election which took place on 9 June, in which he surprisingly defeated Britz with 50.3 percent of the votes, ending a 43 years lasting streak of Social Democratic Mayors in Saarbrücken. He vacated his council seat in September 2019.

He assumed the office of Mayor on 1 October 2019 and is being backed by a so-called Jamaica coalition of CDU, the Green Party and the Free Democrats.

Sources 
 Personal homepage
 Uwe Conradt on the Saarbrücken city homepage

References 

1977 births
People from Saarbrücken
Living people
Christian Democratic Union of Germany politicians
20th-century German politicians
21st-century German politicians
Politicians from Saarland